This is a list of characters from the NBC sitcom The Facts of Life.

Characters table

Edna Garrett

Edna Ann Garrett Gaines, known as Mrs. Garrett or Mrs. G, was played by the actress Charlotte Rae from 1978 to 1986. Garrett was the youngest child in a large family, born and raised on a farm near Appleton, Wisconsin. Her exact age was never disclosed during the series but on several occasions, it was hinted or implied that she was somewhere in her fifties. On Diff'rent Strokes, she was the housekeeper to the Drummond family in New York City after Willis and Arnold's mom Lucy (the Drummonds' original housekeeper) died. In 1979, she took a job as house mother at the Eastland School for Girls in Peekskill, New York (Kimberly Drummond attended Eastland). Over the years, Mrs. Garrett's role on The Facts of Life changed. At first she was merely a live-in supervisor for the girls of Eastland; in the second season she became their in-house dietitian who managed the school's cafeteria. The producers didn’t know that in order to become a registered dietitian, she would have needed a four-year degree in Nutrition, satisfied internship requirements and passed a national exam-impossible to have accomplished in one season. Mrs. Garrett was married twice, divorced (first marriage) and widowed (second marriage); one early episode showed Mr. Garrett coming to town to woo her and reconcile but she was unsuccessful because Edna felt that her gambling problem would always be an obstacle. She had two sons, a singer/songwriter/carpenter named Alex (Tom Fitzsimmons) (born 1953) and an accountant named Raymond (Joel Brooks). Raymond helped her raise funds and secure commercial space so she could open her own gourmet food shop, "Edna's Edibles", in the fall of 1983. The girls, who had previously lived with Mrs. Garrett at Eastland and worked with her in the kitchen to pay off various restitution-related expenses (see below), moved into the living space attached to "Edna's Edibles" and continued to work for Mrs. Garrett in the shop (this time on the payroll). In the fall of 1985, "Edna's Edibles" was extensively damaged by fire; it was rebuilt as a gift shop called "Over Our Heads." Since the insurance on "Edna's Edibles" was insufficient to rebuild it by the time of the fire, the girls contributed their insurance claim checks to help rebuild, effectively making Mrs. Garrett and the girls equal partners in the business. Edna Garrett was a mentor to the girls at Eastland, functioning in loco parentis. At times the girls would take her for granted and forget that Edna herself had problems. Many times Edna would lash out at the girls when they got careless with her. In one episode, she actually fires them from "Edna's Edibles" when their irresponsible behavior ends up costing her $500 in fines after a dismal health inspection. She hires them back the next day when the girls promise her that they will be more responsible at their jobs. She also fires George, when he falls behind on his work constructing "Over Our Heads" but they later make up. Mrs. Garrett is a Democrat. She is also against censorship, such as book banning. Mrs. Garrett remarried in 1986. She and her new husband, Dr. Bruce Gaines (Robert Mandan), rejoined the Peace Corps to work in eastern Africa (Charlotte Rae's contract had expired and she did not want to continue with the series). Edna was replaced by her sister, Beverly Ann Stickle (Cloris Leachman). However, in the reunion movie that aired in 2001, Mrs. Garrett reunited with the three girls (Blair, Natalie and Tootie) at a hotel owned by Blair and which was run by Mrs. Garrett's son Raymond. It was also revealed that Mrs. Garrett and Tootie were widows. It's revealed that she was in a romantic relationship with a ship captain. Mrs. Garrett also appears on the Hello, Larry episode "The Trip", the first of three crossovers between the shows Diff'rent Strokes and Hello, Larry.

Blair Warner

Blair Warner was played by Lisa Whelchel. She was 14 in the series' pilot episode; an episode in the 1985–1986 season centered on her 21st birthday. 

At the series' beginning in 1979, Blair was portrayed as a very rich and very rebellious girl from a blue blood background. She was seen smoking cigarettes, drinking beer and enjoying great popularity with boys; unlike many of her classmates, she was looking to lose her virginity. 

When the show was retooled in 1980, all instances of her rebellion were either dropped or given to the new character of Jo Polniaczek, and Blair was rewritten as an extremely wealthy and unashamedly spoiled "daddy's girl" from Manhattan. 

Blair was vain, arrogant, egotistical, and shallow; but, also funny, kind-hearted, generous, and loving to Mrs. Garrett and her friends, especially Jo Polniaczek.

Blair's chief foil was Jo. At first, the two made no secret of their mutual dislike: They were both completely different. However, over time, Blair began sticking up for and standing by Jo in her time of need (and vice versa). The two eventually developed a close friendship. In the final season episode "Down and Out in Malibu: Part 1", Jo even introduced Blair as her official best friend.

Blair was also intelligent, scoring barely below Jo on the Eastland entrance exam. At Eastland, she won most awards and was seen to be a talented artist. At Langley College, she passed her law school LSATs with only one weekend of studying. 

Blair's delusions of grandeur were usually played for laughs when Natalie, Tootie or Jo would make sarcastic remarks about her "beauty," "perfect" personality or "naturally blonde hair." 

Initially, Blair felt she was more important than "regular" people because she was the heiress to her father's multimillion-dollar business, Warner Textile Mills. However, Blair eventually developed a more down-to-earth attitude, especially after she suffered a car accident (after falling asleep at the wheel) that left her slightly scarred, spoiling her "perfect" beauty. 

In the hospital after her accident, she privately tells Jo a story from her childhood to illustrate how her mother had insisted that she be perfect from a young age. 

Any crisis at Eastland would usually prompt a suggested solution from Blair, preceded by her catch phrase: "I just had another one of my brilliant ideas!" More often than not, though, her "brilliant ideas" were actually quite the opposite, although on at least two occasions they turned out to actually be good (In the episode Growing Pains, it was her idea to have Mrs. Garrett punish them after Tootie gets drunk on wine that Blair, Jo and Natalie were responsible for instead of going to the headmaster, which would have resulted in all of them being expelled. In The Four Musketeers, it was her idea to move back into the room and work in the kitchen to pay off the debt incurred when she and the other girls get into a paint fight while painting the room.). She also said this on occasion to be sarcastic, particularly with Jo. For example, she said her catchphrase once while Jo was distractedly mopping the cafeteria floor and followed it up with 'if you move your feet around while mopping, we just might be done by lunchtime'.  

Blair's parents (played by Nicolas Coster and Marj Dusay) were divorced on June 14, 1973, and although she didn't usually show it, Blair wished that she had a nuclear family like all of her friends. Later in the series, her mother remarried (for the fourth time) and gave birth to a baby girl (Bailey) fathered by her most recent ex-husband. Blair had misgivings about her mother's pregnancy but fell in love with baby Bailey as soon as she saw her.

A secret Blair originally kept from her friends was that her cousin Geri (played by comedian Geri Jewell) had cerebral palsy. She was not embarrassed by her cousin, but rather jealous of her, since Blair was used to being the center of attention. Mrs. Garrett told Blair not to lash out against Geri because of her jealousy and Blair joined Geri, a successful comedian, onstage at an impromptu comedy show Geri threw at the Eastland Academy. 

In other episodes, Blair's former step sister Meg visited Eastland to tell her that she was going to become a nun. In “Best Sister Part 1" and “Best Sister Part 2" it's revealed that Blair is an atheist because she asked God to not allow her parents' divorce to become final in 1973 but her parents split up nevertheless. 

Blair attended Eastland and upon graduating in 1983, attended nearby Langley College. She worked with Mrs. Garrett at "Edna's Edibles" and later, "Over Our Heads." After graduating from Langley, she enrolled in law school. At one point, she purchases the local community center where Jo is employed as a social worker in order to save the facility.

In the series finale, she purchases the financially troubled Eastland Academy and turns it into a co-educational school. 

In the episode "Legacy," Blair, initially enthusiastic about a library being built with her family's funds and named after her late maternal grandfather, Judge Carlton Blair, thus immortalizing the name "Blair," was horrified to learn her grandfather had been a member of the Ku Klux Klan. The revelation devastated Blair and made her question all her assumptions about her supposed "superiority," even though Jo assured her "You're not prejudiced; you're a snob." She almost withdrew the library funding to avoid commemorating her grandfather but finally agreed to let it be built so long as it was not given the "Blair" name. 

In addition to the Diff'rent Strokes episode "The Girls School" that serves as the pilot for The Facts of Life, Blair appears in "The Older Man". 

In the 2001 TV movie The Facts of Life Reunion, Blair, who became a lawyer, is wealthier than ever and owns a hotel empire (Warner Enterprises) with her husband Tad Warner (no relation), managed by Mrs. Garrett's son Raymond; she and Tad have no children. Jo's daughter calls her “Aunt Blair.” At end of the movie, she and Tad decided to adopt a child.  

Note: Actress Geri Reischl ("fake Jan" of The Brady Bunch Hour) was given the role of Blair Warner in the television pilot Garrett's Girls (later renamed The Facts of Life) but was forced to give it up due to her contract with General Mills.

Tootie Ramsey

Dorothy "Tootie" Ramsey was played by Kim Fields. She was the youngest of the main characters at the age of 11 and the only African-American girl. She and her family hailed from Washington, D.C., where her parents worked as lawyers. She attended Eastland Academy for most of the show's run. Tootie's most-remembered attributes were her penchant for rollerskates (at first used by Facts of Life producers to mask Fields' short stature), her gossipy nature and her braces. In real life, Kim Fields had to wear braces for three years, finally having them removed in 1984, after the show begins the sixth season. A lot of Tootie's gossip landed her and her friends in trouble. She was noted for her catch phrase, "We are in trou-ble!" Tootie was involved in many issue-based storylines. For example, Tootie befriended a boy named Fred who insisted that she only associate with black people, in an attempt to realize "her true roots." In another episode, Tootie was chosen by a photographer to model for newspaper advertisements but was instead lured into a borderline kiddie porn operation and was saved by Mrs. Garrett at the last minute. During a trip to New York City, Tootie was almost strong-armed into prostitution before Mrs. Garrett found her and took her home. In another episode, she struggled with the race issue again when her best friend Natalie dated a relative of hers, and Tootie intervened, causing conflict between her and Natalie. Tootie's favorite singer is Michael Jackson's older brother Jermaine Jackson. Tootie helped Mrs. Garrett with her bakery, Edna's Edibles, after-school and then worked full-time at the gift shop Over Our Heads after she graduated from high school in 1986.

In the 2001 The Facts of Life Reunion TV movie, Tootie had attended the Royal Academy of Dramatic Arts in London to pursue an acting career, was a Hollywood-based talk show host and was the single mother of Tisha, a 10-year-old (fathered by her longtime boyfriend and later deceased husband, Jeff Williams). After her visit, Tootie (who now preferred to be called "Dorothy") decided to quit her talk show Waking Up with Dorothy and move to New York to take up the theater, but not before becoming the co-owner of the Peekskill Playhouse. Tisha Williams remained behind to attend Eastland Academy and continue the family tradition.

In addition to the Diff'rent Strokes episode "The Girls School" that serves as the pilot for The Facts of Life, Tootie also appears in "The Slumber Party", "The Bank Job", "First Day Blues" and "The Team".

Natalie Green

Natasha Letisha Sage "Natalie" Green was played by Mindy Cohn. Natalie's best friend was Tootie; they were close in age. Natalie's age was 12 at the series' beginning. Natalie's most defining physical attribute was that she was large-figured but she had a healthy self-image, once quoted as saying, "Who wants to be a skinny pencil? I'd rather be a happy Magic Marker!" Natalie is Jewish, as Mindy Cohn is in real life. Her faith was featured in several episodes. In one, she celebrated Chanukah while the others celebrated Christmas. Her heritage was highlighted when her father, Dr. Green, died unexpectedly; Natalie's bottled-up grief was a continuing storyline. Although she wasn't a mold-fitting "traditional beauty," Natalie was involved in many storylines regarding sex. In an early episode, she dated a boy who spread a rumor that Natalie was easy. In another episode, she was almost sexually assaulted on the way back from a costume party. In the controversial episode "The First Time," toward the series' end, she became the first of the girls to have sex when she slept with her boyfriend Snake on their first anniversary as a couple. A budding writer, she wrote for the Eastland School newspaper. Natalie graduated from Eastland in 1985, in "Bus Stop" (Season 6, Episode 25).  She  delayed attending college for a year to travel across the country by bus, leaving family and friends dismayed because she was postponing Princeton. At the year's end, she decided to attend Langley College, and she became a reporter for the local newspaper in Peekskill. She went to New York City towards the end of the series and decided to stay and pursue her writing career. The episode in which she inspects the SoHo loft she will eventually call home features Richard Grieco and David Spade as her future roommates. The episode (aired in 1988) was originally set up for Mindy Cohn to transition into a spinoff series, but the plans did not materialize.

In the TV-movie The Facts of Life Reunion, she is revealed to be a television news producer at CNN and is also involved with two different men; neither of whom knows of the other. Her boyfriends Robert and Harper were willing, for a short time, to compete for her heart. Though her friends deemed Robert the winner, Natalie eventually choose Harper; Robert accepted this and parted with Natalie on good terms. Natalie was the only one of the girls who was adopted. In one episode, Blair successfully tracked down Natalie's birth mother but Natalie—who realized that her adoptive parents were her true parents, even though they weren't biologically related to her—refused to answer the phone and hear the results of the search, instead inviting her friends to taste the cake "my mother made." However, after an argument with her adoptive mother during a 1982 episode, the subject arose again. Her adoptive mother told Natalie who her biological mother was. Natalie located and met her, but as before, Natalie still considered the mother who had reared her to be her mother.

Natalie also appears in two episodes of Diff'rent Strokes: "The Slumber Party" and "The Older Man."

Jo Polniaczek

Joanna Marie "Jo" Polniaczek was played by Nancy McKeon. Jo was first introduced in the second season in 1980, at 15 years old, arriving at the Eastland Academy on her motorcycle. 

At first, she formed a dislike for fellow schoolmate Blair Warner; the two came from completely different backgrounds and had completely different personalities. However, her relationship with Blair became close as time went on (Jo would even refer to Blair as her best friend by the last season), although the two still argued, traded wisecracks, and made fun of each other from time to time.

In the episode Ain't Miss Beholden, Jo learns that she will lose her scholarship due to budget cuts. She learns that the only scholarship she qualifies for is offered by Blair's family and due to her belief that Blair would hold it over her for the rest of her life she refuses to apply. Blair is at first unconcerned, but Natalie explains that Jo would not be returning the following year due to the cost of attending the school, making Blair realize the seriousness of Jo's situation. Blair secretly sends in an application for Jo and she gets the scholarship. Angry because Blair went behind her back, Jo expects to be in Blair's debt only to have Blair explain she didn't want her to go was the sole reason for her doing it and she expects nothing in return except the cost of the postage for sending it in. She also emphatically states that regardless of how badly they antagonize each other she can admit they were friends regardless of whether Jo could do it. Jo admits they are, marking the first time either one expressed it outright. 

Jo was Polish American and from the Bronx. Early on, she was rebellious, but also highly intelligent (she and Blair achieved the highest scores on the Eastland entrance exams) and secretly sensitive. Jo's mother sent her to Eastland after she, in response to difficulties between her parents, had joined a gang in her hometown. Over time, she grew less angry and hostile toward others. She was ultimately shown to be extremely protective and loyal toward her new friends, particularly Blair. 

When she originally arrived at Eastland on her motorcycle, Jo convinced the girls to steal the school van and use fake IDs to buy drinks at a bar. The van was wrecked and the girls were forced to work in the Eastland cafeteria to make up the repair costs; this was from the second season two-part premiering in November 1980 "The New Girl Part 1". 

In the second episode "The New Girl Part 2", the girls were also placed on house probation and were forced to live across the hall from Mrs. Garrett's room above the cafeteria for a year. 

When the punishment expired, all four girls found other living arrangements but were responsible for cleaning and painting their former room. While painting, their friendship began to rekindle, culminating into an all-out paint fight. This severely damaged the hardwood floor, which required  expensive repairs. The girls decided to move back in together and continued to work in the kitchen to pay off the bill for the damaged floor. 
 
Another problem for Jo came when she shoplifted a blouse for Mrs. Garrett's birthday; Mrs. Garrett was subsequently arrested when she went to exchange the blouse for the smaller size, not knowing the garment was stolen. Jo had to work off the payment of that blouse while Tootie and Natalie did her duties.

Early in the series, Jo's sailor boyfriend, Eddie Brennan (actor Clark Brandon), came to Eastland and convinced her to marry him. They planned to elope to West Virginia, where the marriage age was lower, but Mrs. Garrett and Blair tracked her down at a nearby motel to stop her. Jo had by that point already begun to change her mind when she realized just how difficult teenage marriage would be. Jo returned to Peekskill without Eddie. 

Eddie visited again the following season but things had changed between them. They were moving in different directions and keeping the long-distance relationship going was proving to be very difficult, so they decided to see other people for the time being. Eddie returned late in the fifth season, now an officer in the Navy, but Tootie discovered he was married to a girl in Italy. Clark Brandon's last appearance was in the 5th season's 23rd episode "Seems Like Old Times". 

In the 15th episode of the 4th season called "Teacher's Pet", Jo developed a close friendship with her 26-year-old English teacher, Miss Gail Gallagher (played by Deborah Harmon), who was raised in a similar environment to that of Jo. Gail inspired Jo to think about becoming a teacher herself. When Jo learned from Blair that Gail was quitting Eastland, she became very disappointed, believing that the reason was for a higher-paying job. She was crushed when she found out from Mrs. Garrett that it was because of a terminal illness and had a difficult time coming to terms with her emotions and friendship. 

Early in the series, many of Jo's stories revolved around her tomboyish ways. Jo got into verbal spars with girls who didn't think she was "feminine enough" and boys (including some of her boyfriends) were threatened by her mechanical aptitude, which she displayed by getting a job at a local garage. In the later seasons, Jo's tomboyish image softened considerably, as she and the girls were growing up and was rarely raised as an issue again. 

During one earlier episode, Blair became upset when her boyfriend asked Jo to a country club dance instead of her. Later, Blair nearly attacked him (surprisingly Jo was the one that stopped her) after finding out he tried to sexually assault and humiliate Jo due to his views on women (he thinks Blair's the kind of girl men need in their future and Jo is the kind of girl they need in their past. Blair sums it up as 'There are two kinds of women. The kind you marry, and the kind you...don't). A subsequent conversation between Jo and Blair makes them realize that although they have different backgrounds they can still have the same problems.

Jo and Blair shared many emotional moments throughout the series, showcasing the intensity and complexity of their relationship. When Blair is in a car accident, she is vulnerable only with Jo — who is the first to visit her in the hospital the night of her accident (after hours) — about her fears regarding her looks. In episodes where Jo considers leaving Eastland or where she decides not to get married as a teenager, she openly cries in front of Blair.

Jo graduated from Eastland as valedictorian of her class and attended Langley College with Blair. She worked at the campus radio station and graduated with a degree in education. When the series ended, she was a social worker at a community center owned by Blair. Jo had asked Blair to donate money to keep the facility open for the clients in need. 

Regarding her romances, during Season 6, Jo met and was romanced by a young rock singer named Flyman (played by Michael Damian) in the two-part episode, "Gone With the Wind". She was reunited with him in Season 7, where it was revealed he now had a lounge act in Atlantic City. 

In the last season, Jo married Rick Bonner, a concert musician. She asked Blair to be her maid of honor. In the reunion special after the series ended, Jo's daughter Jamie referred to Blair as “Aunt Blair.”

Jo did not appear at the reunion TV special because it was stated that she was now in the police force and was working; however, Rick and Jamie did attend. This also coincided with Nancy McKeon's role as a police detective in the drama series The Division since the reason she couldn't participate in the reunion was a conflict in her working schedule.

Steven Bradley

Steven Bradley is the headmaster of Eastland Academy and has been nicknamed the "Freud of Sigma Chi". When doing his job, he relied on Emily Mahoney for the first four episodes in order to understand how the academy works as he originally worked in the public school system. In addition to his job, he also taught different classes.

Bradley also looks out for his students as like when he had to rescue Blair and Tootie in "Flash Flood" and wanting to support Molly when her parents get a divorce in "Molly's Holiday". He was also offended when he found that some of the students were smoking marijuana in "Dope" which led to him having those students expelled which Blair and Sue Ann managed to avoid.

The character was dropped after season one and was replaced by Charles Parker.

Emily Mahoney

Emily Mahoney is a teacher at Eastland Academy who teaches history and science. She is a stickler for rules where Steven Bradley often undermines her.

The character was dropped after the episode "I.Q."

Nancy Olsen

Nancy Olsen was portrayed by Felice Schachter. She is an All-American teenager who has the highest I.Q. than any of the girls at Eastland. Nancy has an unseen boyfriend named Roger Butler who she is often talking on the phone with for hours.

The character of Nancy Olsen was gradually written out of the show between summer 1980 and winter 1982, with the character making only a few appearances during seasons two and three. However, she reappeared in the 1986 reunion episode "The Little Chill" where she is engaged to Roger and is three-months pregnant with their first child.

Sue Ann Weaver

Sue Ann Weaver was portrayed by Julie Piekarski. She is an intelligent and boy-crazy girl from Kansas City who always got good grades in school, though her I.Q. is lower than the other students'. Mrs. Garrett once told Sue Ann that I.Q. has nothing to do with her abilities. When it comes to chasing boys, Sue is often in competition with Blair.

The character of Sue Ann Weaver was gradually written out of the show between summer 1980 and winter 1982, with the character making only a few appearances during seasons two and three. However, she reappeared in the 1986 reunion episode "The Little Chill" where she is now a gofer at a company while claiming that she had other positions. Though Jo found out the truth and kept quiet about it to the other girls.

Cindy Webster

Cindy Webster was played by Julie Anne Haddock. She was around 14 years old at the beginning of The Facts of Life. Cindy was an athletic tomboy, who, at the start of the series, was worried she wasn't "normal". The first episode of The Facts of Life, which aired in August 1979, focused on Cindy, who was concerned that she might like girls, after hearing disparaging remarks from snobby Blair. The episode tackled a sensitive issue during an era when lesbianism was rarely talked about on television, although reaction from modern-day critics has been mixed. Stephen Tropiano, writing in 2002, wrote: "While the episode is not really about homosexuality per se, it seems to deliver a contradictory message. On the one hand, wise Mrs. Garrett dispenses Cindy some good advice when she explains the value of being yourself [...] yet there is a sense of relief that Cindy is heading down the road to heterosexuality because she's fallen for a guy she met at the dance."

On the series, Cindy's best friend and roommate was Sue Ann Weaver and the pair appeared together occasionally in episodes, including in an episode where the two girls fight over a racing competition ("Running", 1980). Cindy also does gymnastics and tries out for Harvest Queen at Eastland. She attends journalism class with Blair, Jo and Sue Ann.

The character of Cindy Webster was gradually written out of the show between summer 1980 and winter 1982, with the character making only a few appearances during seasons two and three. However, she reappeared in the 1986 reunion episode "The Little Chill". It was revealed in that episode that Cindy had become a model and was now known professionally as Cindy Baker.

Molly Parker

Molly Parker is portrayed by Molly Ringwald. She is a perky, fast-talking student at Eastland who enjoys taking photographs and playing the guitar. In "Molly's Holiday," it is revealed that her parents are divorced and that she was reluctant to go home during spring break.

The character of Molly Parker was gradually written out of the show between summer 1980 and winter 1982, with the character making only one appearance in "The New Girl: Part 2" where she apologizes to the girls about getting put on probation. Molly didn't appear in "The Little Chill" because Ringwald was working in movies with the Brat Pack at the time.

Kelly Affinado

Kelly Affinado was played by Pamela Segall. She started out as a shoplifter taking things from "Edna's Edibiles" until she got caught by Jo pocketing bread and marinated baby carrots and was sent on her way with Jo preventing Blair from calling the police.

In "Small But Dangerous," Kelly was extorting Mrs. Garrett of the money to pay off the gang that is supposedly causing trouble for "Edna's Edibles." Jo caught on to Kelly's plot and used the phone book to track her down to her apartment. She got the money back from Kelly and told her never to return. Kelly did return and apologized to Mrs. Garrett and the girls....especially Jo.

By her next appearance, Kelly turned herself around and started working for a newspaper vendor selling newspapers on street corners.

The character was dropped after season five.

Andy Moffett

Andy Moffett was portrayed by Mackenzie Astin. He is a boy from a foster home who comes to work for Edna Garrett at Edna's Edibles, and later Over Our Heads.

Late in the 8th season, Andy's foster parents split, prompting Beverly Ann Stickle to adopt him. He later befriends Pippa McKenna.

George Burnett

George Burnett was portrayed by George Clooney. When Edna's Edibles was burned down, George Burnett was hired as a handyman for the development of Over Our Heads.

In "A Star is Torn," George quit working at the hardware store and became a roadie for a singer named Cinnamon.

The character was dropped after season eight.

Beverly Ann Stickle

Beverly Ann Stickle was played by Cloris Leachman. Beverly Ann was first seen in the fall of 1986, after Mrs. Garrett married and moved to Africa to serve in the Peace Corps. In reality, actress Charlotte Rae's contract had expired and she did not want to continue with the series.

At the time when The Facts of Life was still lucrative for NBC, network president Brandon Tartikoff chose to renew but only with a new mother figure at the helm. Mrs. Garrett's divorced sister, Beverly Ann moved in with the girls as Mrs. Garrett wanted someone to keep an eye on them as she had. She became the property owner for Mrs. Garrett's house and the boutique store, Over Our Heads. Beverly Ann's role expanded from confidante to mother when she legally adopted Over Our Heads worker Andy Moffet, who was being shuffled from foster home to foster home. She mentioned that she was named after her grandfather Boris Ann.

Pippa McKenna

Pippa McKenna was portrayed by Sherrie Krenn. She is a teenage girl from Eastland's Australian sister school Colunga Academy. She enrolled in Eastland Academy as an exchange student while taking the place of her best friend Frannie Newcomb. Pippa's ruse was exposed around the time when her father Kevin showed up and wanted to bring her home while having mentioned that she ran away from their home, though he eventually relents and allows her to stay.

Notes

References

Lists of American sitcom television characters
Characters